1967 in professional wrestling describes the year's events in the world of professional wrestling.

List of notable promotions 
Only one promotion held notable shows in 1967.

Calendar of notable shows

Accomplishments and tournaments

EMLL

Championship changes

EMLL

NWA

Debuts
Debut date uncertain:
Bobby Kay
Giant Haystacks
Jerry Brisco
Johnny Valiant
Man Mountain Mike
August 5  Seiji Sakaguchi
August 19  Ole Anderson
October  Ari Romero

Births
Date of birth uncertain:
Jumbo Baretta
January 4  Nelson Veilleux 
January 10  Yumiko Hotta
January 13  Reno Riggins
January 17  Luther Biggs 
January 22  Manabu Nakanishi
February 8:
Dino Casanova (died in 2002)
Yuki Ishikawa 
February 18  Rick Fuller 
February 21  Danny Boy Collins 
February 22  Psicosis II
March 1  Scotty Riggs
March 4  Johnnie Stewart
March 9  Bison Kimura
March 11  Pitbull #1
March 17  Billy Corgan
March 27  Kenta Kobashi
March 28  Yoji Anjo
April 13  Mo
April 14  Jeff Jarrett
April 17  Enson Inoue 
April 23  Mark Young (died in 2016)
April 25  J.T. Smith 
April 26  Kane
April 29  Master P 
May 2  Marty Garner
May 4  Jim Steele 
May 9  Kevin Kelly
May 10  Nitro
May 17  Lori Fullington
May 21  Chris Benoit(died in 2007) 
May 24  Bambi 
May 28  Buddy Wayne(died in 2017) 
May 30  Vampiro
June 1  Scoot Andrews
June 29  Heidi Lee Morgan
July 3  KeMonito
July 9  Andy Barrow
July 13  Akira Hokuto
July 24  Buck Quartermain
July 26  Pitbull #2(died in 2003)  
August 3  El Picudo
August 5  Brody Steele 
August 8: 
Eric Angle 
Sable
August 13  Chad Fortune 
September 9  Mark Shrader 
September 19  Alexander Karelin
September 20  Roger Anderson
September 22  Super Delfin
September 29  Joey Maggs(died in 2006)  
October 2  Pierrothito
October 9  Eddie Guerrero(died in 2005) 
October 11  Tazz
October 13  Don Callis
October 22  Andrew Anderson 
October 25  Latin Lover
October 26  Combat Toyoda
November 1  Plum Mariko(died in 1997)
November 9  Tim Fischer 
November 13  Ice Train 
November 15  Michiyoshi Ohara
November 22  Ron Powers
December 15:
Kendall Windham
Elix Skipper
December 19  Erik Watts
December 21:
Jake Gymini
Jesse Gymini
Harley Saito (died in 2016) 
December 30  PCO

Deaths
January 7 - Leo Savage, 66
June 29  Primo Carnera 60
July 13 - Art Shires, 60
August 1  Gorila Ramos 53
September 23  Stanislaus Zbyszko, 88

References

 
professional wrestling